Karl H. Meyer (born 1937 in West Rupert, Vermont) is an American pacifist, activist, Catholic Worker, and tax resister. He is the son of William H. Meyer, a former member of the United States House of Representatives from Vermont. He is the founder of the Nashville Greenlands Catholic Worker community in Nashville, Tennessee.

Life 
Karl Meyer grew up in West Rupert, Vermont. His father first worked there as a soil-conservation agent, later he became a member of the Congress. In 1953, Karl went to the University of Chicago with a scholarship at the age of only 16. Rather soon, he dropped his study and went to New York City where he worked as a stock clerk at a bookstore. Due to recommendations of his former resident head, Meyer read books of several catholic authors just like Ammon Hennacy and Dorothy Day, who were engaged in the Catholic Worker Movement. According to his own words, Meyer found in the Catholic Worker "the most authentic American movement for change." 
 
In 1961, Meyer participated in the Peace March to Moscow, together with a group of activists across the US and then across Europe into the Soviet Union. In 1965, Meyer opposed the death penalty by walking from Chicago to Springfield, Illinois, dragging a mock electric chair on a cart.

Meyer has been arrested more than 50 times while protesting, among other things, against the Cold War, the Vietnam War, conditions in East Germany, the wars in El Salvador and Nicaragua, the death penalty and UN sanctions against Iraq. According to Richard Mertens of The University of Chicago Magazine, Meyer has committed his work to embrace peace by "living much of his life in voluntary poverty while trying to serve the poor and the unemployed."

See also
 List of peace activists

References

Further reading 
 Sicius, Francis J. Karl Meyer, The Catholic Worker, and Active Personalism. in Records of the American Catholic Historical Society of Philadelphia, vol. 93, no. 1/4, American Catholic Historical Society, 1982, pp. 107–123

1937 births
American Christian pacifists
American Christian socialists
American Roman Catholics
American tax resisters
Catholics from Vermont
Catholic socialists
Catholic Workers
Living people